The 1995 Argentine Grand Prix (formally the XVIII  Gran Premio Marlboro de la Republica Argentina) was a Formula One motor race held on 9 April 1995 at the Autódromo Oscar Alfredo Gálvez, Buenos Aires, Argentina. It was the second race of the 1995 Formula One World Championship and the first running of the Argentine Grand Prix since .

The 72-lap race was won by Damon Hill, driving a Williams-Renault, after starting from second position. Jean Alesi was second in a Ferrari, with Michael Schumacher third in a Benetton-Renault. Hill's teammate, David Coulthard, took the first pole position of his F1 career before retiring with an electrical failure.

Report

Background
This was the first running of the Argentine Grand Prix since . The race had been removed from the Formula One calendar due to the retirement of Carlos Reutemann and Argentina's invasion of the Falkland Islands, before being reinstated following President Carlos Menem's rise to power in 1989 and the subsequent modernisation of the Autódromo Oscar Alfredo Gálvez.

The No. 6 configuration of the circuit was to be used - the race having previously used the No. 2 and No. 9 configurations, as well as the long and fast No. 15 configuration. To celebrate the race's return, Reutemann drove a demonstration lap of the circuit aboard the  Ferrari 412 T1 on the Thursday afternoon before the race. The track, however, was criticised due to its "dirtiness".

In the two weeks between the Brazilian and Argentine Grands Prix, the FIA rescinded the rule requiring that holes be cut in the airboxes; consequently, all the cars arrived at the circuit with their airbox holes filled.

Practice and qualifying
As the No. 6 configuration of the circuit was new to the Formula One calendar, a familiarisation session was held on the Thursday. The first practice session proper was held on Friday morning, followed in the afternoon by the first one-hour qualifying session. On Saturday, the second practice session was held, followed by the second qualifying session.

Both qualifying session took place in wet conditions, with several drivers spinning; only towards the end of the Saturday session did the conditions improve. David Coulthard took the first pole position of his F1 career, with a time of 1:53.241 in his Williams. Teammate Damon Hill was alongside him on the front row of the grid, despite his time being 0.8 seconds slower, with Michael Schumacher third in the Benetton. Eddie Irvine took fourth in the Jordan, followed by Mika Häkkinen in the McLaren, Jean Alesi in the Ferrari, and Mika Salo in the Tyrrell. The top ten was completed by Gerhard Berger in the second Ferrari, Heinz-Harald Frentzen in the Sauber and Rubens Barrichello in the second Jordan. The Simteks impressed with Jos Verstappen taking 14th, ahead of Mark Blundell in the second McLaren and both Ligiers, and Domenico Schiattarella 20th.

Race
In dry conditions and with President Menem in attendance, Coulthard led away while, behind him, Alesi spun on the inside of the first corner. Salo, braking to avoid Alesi, was hit from behind by Luca Badoer's Minardi, causing him to run into the side of the second Benetton of Johnny Herbert. In turn, Herbert hit Barrichello, as did Badoer, with the second Tyrrell of Ukyo Katayama also becoming involved. Behind them, Olivier Panis in the Ligier hit the back of Pierluigi Martini in the second Minardi. The race was red-flagged, and Alesi, Herbert, Barrichello, Katayama, Panis and Martini returned to the pits to take their teams' respective spare cars for the restart (meaning Badoer's weekend was over), while Salo's car was repaired on the grid.

On the second formation lap, Karl Wendlinger stalled his Sauber and was forced to start at the back of the grid. Coulthard again led away, while behind him there were more collisions: Häkkinen trod on Irvine's front wing on the run down to the first corner and retired immediately, while Wendlinger tangled with both Pacifics, putting all three out. Irvine made it back to the pits for a replacement nose, but retired on lap 7 when his engine failed.

Coulthard led until lap 6 when his throttle failed and restarted, allowing Schumacher and Hill past. Hill overtook Schumacher on lap 11 and led until making his first pit stop on lap 16. The recovering Coulthard passed Schumacher to take back the lead, only for his throttle to fail permanently almost immediately after. When Schumacher made his first stop, Alesi inherited the lead and held it for eight laps, before pitting himself. Behind them, Verstappen moved up to sixth in his Simtek, before suffering a long pit stop followed by a gearbox failure on lap 24.

After his stop, Alesi was nearly half a minute behind Hill, but ahead of Schumacher. Hill retained the lead for the rest of the race, though Alesi closed the gap to 6.4 seconds by the chequered flag. Despite setting the fastest lap of the race on lap 55, Schumacher finished 27 seconds behind Alesi, with teammate Herbert fourth. Salo was running fifth, close behind Herbert, when he collided with Aguri Suzuki in the second Ligier on lap 48; he angrily confronted the Japanese driver in the pit lane before telling the BBC that "drivers like Suzuki should not be in Formula One". Fifth thus went to Frentzen, with Berger picking up the final point for sixth. Following Verstappen's retirement, Schiattarella finished ninth to equal Simtek's best-ever result.

Berger's point kept him in the lead of the Drivers' Championship, pending the appeals to Schumacher and Coulthard's disqualifications from the Brazilian Grand Prix.

Post-race
Four days after the race, the FIA International Court of Appeal overturned the disqualifications from Brazil, meaning that Schumacher led the Drivers' Championship by four points from Hill with Berger dropping to fifth.

Meanwhile, in response to the criticism, the track was resurfaced over the winter of 1995-96, ready for the 1996 running of the race.

Classification

Qualifying

Race 

The Forti drivers were not classified, as they did not complete 90% race distance, but they did not retire.

Championship standings after the race

Drivers' Championship standings

Constructors' Championship standings

References

Argentine Grand Prix
Argentine Grand Prix
Argentine Grand Prix
Argentine Grand Prix